Il vigile urbano is an Italian television series. The series is set in Rome and revolves around the adventures of the watchful Urbano Tommasi. The main actor is Lino Banfi.

Story
The policeman Urban Tommasi, daily telephone call to the victim Commander of the body of the municipal police of Rome, Augusto Tafuri, asking permission to launch into one of his many companies, invariably authorization has been granted by the Commander poor exasperated. Urbano is not alone, in fact, can always count on her daughter Milena, the sweeper and his friend since childhood segli Tobia and the daily horoscopes are made by Agnese door. Urbano Tommasi runs well, every day, in many problems of a city like Rome, always helping everyone, but never able to realize his dream ... Read their own businesses and those of the body of the traffic police in the newspaper!

Episodes in Italian

See also
List of Italian television series

External links
 

Italian television series
1989 Italian television series debuts
1990 Italian television series endings
RAI original programming